In mathematics, the gradient conjecture, due to René Thom (1989), was proved in 2000 by three Polish mathematicians, Krzysztof Kurdyka (University of Savoie, France), Tadeusz Mostowski (Warsaw University, Poland) and Adam Parusiński (University of Angers, France).

The conjecture states that given a real-valued analytic function f defined on Rn and a trajectory x(t) of the gradient vector field of f having a limit point x0 ∈ Rn, where f has an isolated critical point at x0, there exists a limit (in the projective space PRn-1) for the secant lines from x(t) to x0, as t tends to zero.

The proof depends on a theorem due to Stanis%C5%82aw %C5%81ojasiewicz.

References

 R. Thom (1989) "Problèmes rencontrés dans mon parcours mathématique: un bilan", Publications Math%C3%A9matiques de l%27IH%C3%89S 70: 200 to 214. (This gradient conjecture due to René Thom was in fact well-known among specialists by the early 70's, having been often discussed during that period by Thom during his weekly seminar on singularities at the IHES.)
 In 2000 the conjecture was proven correct in Annals of Mathematics 152: 763 to 792. The proof is available here.

Theorems in analysis